The Back Breaker (Persian: Kamarshekan) is a 1951 Iranian comedy film directed by Ebrahim Moradi.

Cast
 Abdullah Basirat 
 Ahmad Emami 
 Reza Mirfattah 
 Ebrahim Moradi 
 Akhtar Partovi 
 Asghar Simyari

References

Bibliography 
 Mohammad Ali Issari. Cinema in Iran, 1900-1979. Scarecrow Press, 1989.

External links 
 

1951 films
Iranian comedy films
1950s Persian-language films
Films directed by Ebrahim Moradi
1951 comedy films
Iranian black-and-white films